Sir Donald Claude Tebbit  (4 May 1920 – 25 September 2010) was a British diplomat.

He attended The Perse School, Cambridge, and Trinity Hall, Cambridge. He was president of the Trinity Hall alumni association, the Trinity Hall Association, 1984–1985.

He was Chief Clerk of the Foreign and Commonwealth Office from 1973 to 1976, and British High Commissioner to Australia 1976–80.

In 2009 he was appointed a Vice-President of the Britain–Australia Society. On 25 September 2010 he died at age 90.

References
TEBBIT, Sir Donald (Claude), Who Was Who, A & C Black, 1920–2015 (online edition, Oxford University Press, 2014)

External links

Sir Donald Tebbit  (obituary), The Telegraph, London, 10 October 2010

1920 births
2010 deaths
People educated at The Perse School
Alumni of Trinity Hall, Cambridge
High Commissioners of the United Kingdom to Australia
Knights Grand Cross of the Order of St Michael and St George
Place of birth missing
Place of death missing